George Pinder (15 July 1841 – 15 January 1903) was an English first-class cricketer.

His birth name was George Pinder Hattersley and he was born in Ecclesfield, Sheffield, Yorkshire, England. A wicket-keeper, he played for Yorkshire from 1867 to 1880, and for the All-England Eleven from 1867 to 1871. He also umpired in some matches between 1873 and 1880.

He was recognised as a fine wicket-keeper, his work to the fast bowlers - at a time when keepers "stood up" (i.e. within arm's reach of the wicket) to fast bowling - being particularly impressive. He had plenty of practice, since Tom Emmett was in the same Yorkshire side. He had to deal with Emmett's famous "sostenuter", a ball pitching on the leg stump and then breaking sharply towards the off bail. He was renowned for the slickness of his stumpings of batsmen. When Tom Hearne was stumped off a leg-shooter he exclaimed: "I don't call that stumping; I call it shovelling of 'em in!"

He is believed to have been the first keeper to dispense with a long-stop, during a North v. South match in the mid or late 1870s. The idea came from his captain A. N. Hornby. Pinder was at first reluctant, but the experiment was a success. On another occasion, at The Oval, Ephraim Lockwood who was fielding long-stop said: "Nay, George, I've been behind thee for twenty-three overs and had nowt to stop. I'm off where there's summat [something] to do."

Pinder died in January 1903 in Hickleton, Yorkshire, aged 61.

Bibliography
 A. A. Thomson, Cricket My Happiness, Sportsmans Book Club edition, 1956, p103-104

References

External links
 CricketArchive
 Brief profile by Don Ambrose
 Wisden Cricketers' Almanack, 1972 edition, "From Tom Sueter to Alan Knott, The great wicket-keepers" by Rowland Ryder

1841 births
1903 deaths
All-England Eleven cricketers
English cricket umpires
People from Ecclesfield
English cricketers
English cricketers of 1864 to 1889
Cricketers from Sheffield
Yorkshire cricketers
United North of England Eleven cricketers
Players cricketers
North v South cricketers
Gentlemen of the North cricketers
Players of the North cricketers
R. Daft's XI cricketers
Wicket-keepers